Sea Legs is a 1930 American pre-Code comedy film directed by Victor Heerman and written by George Marion Jr. and Marion Dix. The film stars Jack Oakie, Eugene Pallette, Lillian Roth, André Cheron, Albert Conti, Harry Green and Jean Del Val. The film was released on November 29, 1930, by Paramount Pictures.

Cast 
Jack Oakie as Searchlight Doyle
Eugene Pallette as Hyacinth Nitouche
Lillian Roth as Adrienne
André Cheron as High Commissioner
Albert Conti as Captain
Harry Green as Gabriel Grabowski
Jean Del Val as Crosseti
Charles Sellon as	Adm. O'Brien
Tom Ricketts as Commander

References

External links
 

1930 films
1930 comedy films
American comedy films
American black-and-white films
Films directed by Victor Heerman
Paramount Pictures films
1930s English-language films
1930s American films